Gary Henshaw (born 18 February 1965) is an English former professional footballer who played in the Football League as a midfielder. After retiring he worked as a commentator for his former team Bolton Wanderers. During the 2020–21 season he was criticised by then Bolton Manager Ian Evatt for his negative commentary, with Evatt annoyed that Henshaw was criticising the players despite them being on a winning streak.

References

1964 births
Living people
English footballers
Association football midfielders
Grimsby Town F.C. players
Bolton Wanderers F.C. players
Rochdale A.F.C. players
Swansea City A.F.C. players
Chorley F.C. players
Runcorn F.C. Halton players
Hyde United F.C. players
Radcliffe F.C. players
National League (English football) players
English Football League players
English association football commentators